Jolien van Vliet (born 24 July 1998) is a Dutch cricketer. In July 2018, she was named in the Netherlands' squad for the 2018 ICC Women's World Twenty20 Qualifier tournament. She made her Women's Twenty20 International (WT20I) for the Netherlands against United Arab Emirates in the World Twenty20 Qualifier on 7 July 2018.

In May 2019, she was named in Netherlands' squad for the 2019 ICC Women's Qualifier Europe tournament in Spain. In October 2021, she was named in the Dutch team for the 2021 Women's Cricket World Cup Qualifier tournament in Zimbabwe.

References

External links
 

1998 births
Living people
Dutch women cricketers
Netherlands women One Day International cricketers
Netherlands women Twenty20 International cricketers
Place of birth missing (living people)
20th-century Dutch women
21st-century Dutch women